Selavayal() is mainly a residential locality in the northern part of the metropolitan city of Chennai, Tamil Nadu state, India.

Location

Selavayal is located near Madhavaram Milk Colony, Chennai Magic Nursery Garden Sri Durgai Avenue, KKD Nagar, Kodungaiyur, MKB Nagar, Manali.

Surroundings

Neighbourhoods in Chennai